Õ Blésq Blom is the fifth studio album by Brazilian rock band Titãs.

Background 
During the previous album's (Go Back) tour, in Recife's leg, Titãs met at the Boa Viagem Beach a couple of repentismo musicians, Mauro and Quitéria. After listening to them and appreciating their performance, they decided to record them right there, using a recorder they often carried in their trips. The recorded song was used  as the opening and ending tracks of the album and of its subsequent tour.

Mauro was a former stevedore at Recife Port and, being constantly exposed to foreigners, ended up learning several words in different languages. With the help of his wife, who started to guide him after he went blind in 1982, he would walk around the beach singing songs written in several languages at once - even though he wouldn't know the words' actual meanings - for some change. Due to their participation in the album, they received the sum of NCzS 6,000 (they would normally make between NCzS 40 and NCzS 100 a day with their public presentations).

There were plans to invite the duo to their tour, but it wasn't possible due to production limitations. At the tour's time, vocalist/saxophonist Paulo Miklos and guitarist Marcelo Fromer announced they planned to produce an album by Mauro and Quitéria via WEA.

In July 1989, bassist/vocalist Nando Reis's mother died and he began the recording sessions still deeply affected by her death, but he later commented that the work was essential to help him process the loss.

During the album's sessions, they were visited by couple Tina Weymouth and Chris Frantz, respectively the bassist and the drummer of Talking Heads.

Song information 
The song "Faculdade" came to Reis in a dream.

Several other songs besides the ones that actually made it to the final tracklist were prepared for the album and were left out of it. Two of them were later recovered for the Acústico MTV live album: "Nem 5 Minutos Guardados" and "A Melhor Forma". Six others (namely "Aqui É Legal", "Estrelas", "Eu Prefiro Correr", "Minha Namorada", "Porta Principal" and "Saber Sangrar") had their initial versions released later on the E-collection compilation (2001), along with other rare tracks.

Release and promotion 
The album was released on 16 October in a show at the São Paulo Museum of Image and Sound. As part of the album's promotional efforts, the band hired a group of graffiti artists called Tupi Não Dá (a pun on Tupinambá) to write the album's name in several strategic points of São Paulo. They also invited Caetano Veloso to write the album's press release; his son Moreno wrote a PS.

Title and cover 
The name of the album means "the first men who walked on Earth" in the language of Mario and Quiteria and it comes from the lyrics for the opening track; Reis claims he was probably the one who suggested using it as the title, and he's sure he was the one who suggested adding a tilde to the "o" letter.

The cover art is a collage by vocalist Arnaldo Antunes, who produced five artworks and the band subsequently elected one for the final product.

Impact and legacy 
In two weeks, the album reached gold status, having sold 100,000 copies. According to Dicionário Cravo Albin da Música Popular Brasileira, the album sold 230,000 copies.

It was elected in 2007 by Rolling Stone Brasil as the 74th best Brazilian music album of all time. Two years prior, its cover had been elected by Bizz magazine as the 100th main rock cover of all time.

In an article published the year before in the same magazine, vocalist and keyboardist Sérgio Britto said he considered this album to be one of the best by the band, along with its predecessors Cabeça Dinossauro and Jesus não Tem Dentes no País dos Banguelas. He also said the work, "if it did not influence, at least it anticipated all that Mangue Beat wave and the mixture of MPB and nordestina music with elements of rock and electronic programming."

Then vocalist Paulo Miklos, in a 2012 interview to the same magazine, added: "In front of our stage, debuting in Recife, there were everybody which would be from the manguebeat, in the front row. [Fred] Zeroquatro [from Mundo Livre S/A] and the whole gang. This was said to me by Chico Science. As such, that moment in which we took Mauro and Quitéria at the beach and recorded that album was a laboratory moment to make that aesthetic clash which generates something, pop rock mixed with nordestina music, with a dose of violent brazilianity and stuff."

Critical reception 

Writing for Jornal do Brasil, Aponean Rodrigues called the album "correct, good to listen to and to dance to and with moments of critical poetry". He considered Cabeça Dinossauro the "establishment of a career", Jesus não Tem Dentes no País dos Banguelas the evolution of this establishment and Õ Blésq Blom the consolidation of this evolution. He also said that "following this path, in its resplendent ascension to the Brazilian rock's Olympus to claim the crown or the curse of best Brazilian band of the genre (...) Titãs have been doing a coherent and quality job." He also praised the production, the vocals and the tracks, amidst which he found nothing below the average.

On the same newspaper, some issues later, critics Fábio Rodrigues, Tárik de Souza and Aldir Blanc also praised the album in the "O disco em questão" section.

Track listing

Personnel 
 Tony Bellotto - Electric guitar, Acoustic guitar on "Flores", 12 string acoustic guitar on "32 Dentes"
 Arnaldo Antunes - lead vocals on "Medo" and "O Pulso", co-lead vocals on "Natureza Morta", backing vocals on "Miséria", "Raciosimio", "O Camelo e o Dromedário", "Flores", "32 Dentes", "Faculdade" and "Deus e o Diabo"
 Charles Gavin - drums
 Marcelo Fromer - Electric guitar, acoustic guitar on "32 Dentes" and "Medo"
 Nando Reis - Bass, lead vocals in "Raciosimio" and "Faculdade"
 Branco Mello - lead vocals on "Flores" and "32 Dentes", co-lead vocals "Natureza Morta", backing vocals on "Miséria", "Raciosimio", "O Camelo e o Dromedário", "Medo", "O Pulso", "Faculdade" and "Deus e o Diabo"
 Paulo Miklos - lead vocals in "O Camelo e o Dromedário", co-lead vocals "Miséria" and "Deus e o Diabo", Saxophone on "Flores", backing vocals on "Raciosimio", "Medo", "Flores", "O Pulso", "32 Dentes" and "Faculdade"
 Sérgio Britto - Keyboards, lead vocals in "Palavras", co-lead vocals "Miséria" and "Deus e o Diabo", keyboard programming on "Miséria" and "Deus e o Diabo", additional backing vocals on "Flores"

Additional personnel 
 Liminha - Electronic drums in "Miséria", "Deus e o Diabo" and "Faculdade", electric guitar in "O Pulso" and "Deus e o Diabo", electronic percussion in "O Camelo e o Dromedário", keyboard programming in "O Pulso", "Miséria" and "Deus e o Diabo"

References 

Titãs albums
1989 albums
Warner Music Group albums
Albums produced by Liminha